Nahuel Pulitano Jiménez (born 15 August 1987 in Buenos Aires, Argentina) is an Argentine former professional footballer who played as a midfielder.

Clubs
 Independiente 2006–2007
 Rangers 2008
 Platense 2008–2009
 Varese 2009–2010
 Città di Marino 2010–2012
 Valletta F.C. 2012–2013
 CF Mérida 2013–2015
 Sportivo Italiano 2015

References
 
 

1987 births
Living people
Argentine footballers
Association football midfielders
Chilean Primera División players
Argentine Primera División players
Maltese Premier League players
Club Atlético Independiente footballers
Rangers de Talca footballers
Club Atlético Platense footballers
S.S.D. Varese Calcio players
Valletta F.C. players
Venados F.C. players
Sportivo Italiano footballers
Argentine expatriate footballers
Argentine expatriate sportspeople in Chile
Expatriate footballers in Chile
Argentine expatriate sportspeople in Italy
Expatriate footballers in Italy
Argentine expatriate sportspeople in Malta
Expatriate footballers in Malta
Argentine expatriate sportspeople in Mexico
Expatriate footballers in Mexico
Footballers from Buenos Aires